The Church of San Juan (Spanish: Iglesia de San Juan) is a church located in Salvatierra, Spain. It was declared Bien de Interés Cultural in 1984.

References 

Churches in Álava
Bien de Interés Cultural landmarks in Álava